This links to lists of Catholic schools.

By country
 Australia
 List of Catholic schools in New South Wales
 Canada
 List of schools of the Ottawa Catholic School Board
 List of schools in the Toronto Catholic District School Board
 List of Catholic schools in Hong Kong
 List of Catholic schools in Ireland by religious order
 List of Jesuit schools in Ireland
 List of Catholic schools in New Zealand
 List of Catholic universities and colleges in the Philippines

United States
By state
 List of Catholic schools in New York

By archdiocese or diocese
 List of schools in the Roman Catholic Archdiocese of Atlanta
 List of schools in the Roman Catholic Archdiocese of Baltimore
 List of schools in the Roman Catholic Diocese of Baton Rouge
 List of schools in the Roman Catholic Archdiocese of Boston
 List of schools in the Roman Catholic Diocese of Brooklyn
 List of schools of the Roman Catholic Archdiocese of Chicago
 List of schools of the Roman Catholic Diocese of Des Moines
 List of schools in the Roman Catholic Archdiocese of Detroit
 List of schools in the Roman Catholic Archdiocese of Dubuque
 List of schools in the Roman Catholic Diocese of Fall River
 List of schools in the Roman Catholic Diocese of Fresno
 List of schools of the Roman Catholic Diocese of Gallup
 List of schools in the Roman Catholic Diocese of Green Bay
 List of schools in the Roman Catholic Archdiocese of Hartford
 List of schools in the Roman Catholic Diocese of Jackson
 List of schools in the Roman Catholic Archdiocese of Los Angeles
 List of schools of the Roman Catholic Archdiocese of Louisville
 List of schools in the Roman Catholic Archdiocese of Miami
 List of schools in the Roman Catholic Archdiocese of Milwaukee
 List of schools in the Roman Catholic Archdiocese of New Orleans
 List of schools in the Roman Catholic Archdiocese of New York
 List of closed schools in the Roman Catholic Archdiocese of New York
 List of schools in the Roman Catholic Archdiocese of Philadelphia
 List of schools in the Roman Catholic Diocese of Providence
 List of schools in the Roman Catholic Diocese of Rockville Centre
 List of schools in the Roman Catholic Archdiocese of Washington
 List of schools in the Roman Catholic Archdiocese of San Francisco

By type
 List of independent Catholic schools in the United States

By order
 List of Christian Brothers schools
 List of Jesuit educational institutions
 Lasallian educational institutions
 List of Marist Brothers schools
 List of Schools of the Sacred Heart

By name
 List of schools named after Francis Xavier

Lists of Catholic schools